Carol Bennett (born 1954), is a Hawaii based painter and glass artist.

Early life
Bennett was born in Los Angeles, California. She received a Bachelor of Arts (B.A) from the University of California, Santa Barbara, College of Creative Studies in 1974 and another B.A. from the Art Center College of Design in 1978.  Since 1990, she has lived in Kauai.

Public Art
Her artworks in public places include:
Rise, Fall and Drink, three 5 ft x 8 ft, oil and enamel on glass paintings, Hawaii Convention Center, 2001
Ocean Patterns, 180-foot-long mural, oil on birch ply, Daniel K. Inouye International Airport, 2002
Kanawai, two Italian glass mosaic tile murals, each 11 x 22 feet, Kauai Judiciary Building, 2005
Water: A Point of Departure, two acrylic on Dacron sail cloth, 8 x 26 ft. and 8 x 52 ft, Foyer and Passenger Queuing at Pier 2 Terminal, Honolulu Harbor, 2008-2009
Trigger Picasso Energy, 48 x 8 foot hand-painted colored vitreous enamels fired on float glass with gold leaf and photovoltaic solar cells, Hawaii State Art Museum, 2012
Cycles, fused glass and light-emitting diodes, on exterior of the James and Abigail Campbell Library, University of Hawaiʻi – West Oʻahu, 2012

Collections
The Hawaii State Art Museum and the Honolulu Museum of Art are among the museums holding works by Bennett.

Themes
Bennett's paintings are generally related to water; swimmers and fishing nets are recurring subjects.  They often contain totally abstract passages representing reflections, as in Jewel.

References

American glass artists
1954 births
Painters from Hawaii
20th-century American painters
Living people
21st-century American painters